Solberge Hall Hotel near Northallerton, North Yorkshire, England, is a Georgian house of historical significance. It was built in 1824 by John Hutton, a local landowner. It remained in the Hutton family for about one hundred years and was then purchased by Benjamin Talbot the inventor. It is now a hotel which provides accommodation and restaurant services and caters for special events particularly weddings.

The Hutton family

John Hutton (1794-1857) built Solberge Hall in 1824. He was born in 1794 in Newby Wiske. His father was Robert Hutton and his mother was Margaret Squire. The Hutton family had purchased Sober Gate which is adjacent to Solberge Hall in 1684 and had lived there since then. In 1812 when John was only eight years old, his father died, leaving him and his sister Margaret in the care of their mother at Sober Gate. John inherited this property when he came of age, and in 1821 he bought Solberge Manor from George Osbaldeston, the famous cricketer. In 1824, he built Solberge Hall, which for many years was called Sowber Hill. John lived with his sister Margaret for some years, but tragically she died in 1833 at the age of 36. He erected a very elaborate memorial to her in St Michael’s and All Angels Church in North Otterington, which can be seen today. It was considered to be a very artistic work and the British Museum still holds an illustration of the monument.

In 1845 at the age of 50, John married Caroline Robson who was the daughter of Thomas Robson of Holtby Hall. The couple had two sons. When John died in 1857, he was described in the York Herald as being “in all respects a real English country gentleman. He was applauded for his innovative agricultural activities, as some of his experiments in crop growing and animal feeding were adopted by others and assisted in production.

The eldest son, John Hutton (1847-1921), inherited Solberge Hall. He was educated at Eton and later went to Oxford University. In 1870, he married Caroline Shore, who was the daughter of Charles John Shore, 2nd Baron Teignmouth. They had one son. John became a Member of Parliament and served in this role for many years. He also served on the North Riding County Council.

In 1913 John put Solberge Hall on the market and Benjamin Talbot bought the property

Benjamin Talbot

Benjamin Talbot, inventor and steel company manager, moved into Solberge Hall in about 1913. In the following year he became a Magistrate for North Riding. Benjamin Talbot (1864-1947) was born in 1864 at Hadley, near Wellington, Shropshire. He was the second son of Benjamin Talbot who owned the Castle ironworks in Wellington. After he finished school he went to work in his father’s ironworks. In 1884 he married Frances Ann Chapman and then moved to USA for ten years where he invented new techniques in the production of steel.

He returned to England in 1900 and implemented his new inventions into some of the English Steel Companies. In 1907 he became Managing Director of Cargo Fleet Iron Company and transformed it into a stable profitable firm. He also became a director of several other steel companies. For his outstanding inventions he was awarded the Bessemer gold medal of the Iron and Steel Institute, the Elliott Cresson gold medal, and the John Scott medal of the Franklin Institute. In 1928 he was elected president of the Iron and Steel Institute and served as president of the National Federation of Iron and Steel Manufacturers.

He had four children one of whom was Viva Talbot. She was only 13 when she came to Solberge Hall and she lived with her parents until she married in 1941 at the age of 41. She was a notable artist and has been recently given an exhibition of some of her woodcuts depicting the steel companies of her father.

Benjamin Talbot died in 1947 and the following year Solberge Hall was sold.

References

External links
 Solberge Hall website

Hotels in North Yorkshire